Alief Kerr High School is an Alief ISD public school located in the Alief community, and in the limited purpose city limits of Houston, Texas, United States. The school is a part of the Alief Independent School District and serves grades 9 through 12.

Kerr High School was awarded the Blue Ribbon School Award of Excellence by the United States Department of Education, the highest award an American school can receive, during the 2010–11 school year. The school also received the award in 2016, one of only 26 Texas schools to receive the award. The school also received the award in 2022.

It is located in the International District.

History

Kerr High School was formally dedicated on March 12, 1995. It was named for Carey Jean Kerr, who began her 15-year career in Alief at Chancellor Elementary in 1976. In 1982, she transferred to Alief Middle School, where she was a special populations counselor and worked with at-risk students.

"Her open-door policy inspired a trusting bond special needs kids often find hard to develop...Carey's accomplishments are immeasurable," reads the letter of nomination to the school board.

Kerr died in 1992 after a severe asthma attack.  The school opened in the fall of 1994. In May 1996, the first class had approximately 55 students graduate.

Demographics
In the 2018–2019 school year, there were 796 students. 11.3% were African American, 63.1% were Asian, 20.2% were Hispanic, 0.5% were American Indian, 4.3% were White, and 0.6% were two or more races. 66.6% of students were Economically Disadvantaged, 0.9% were English Language Learners, and 0.3% received Special Education services.

Structure

Unlike a regular magnet school, such as Houston ISD's DeBakey High School for Health Professions, Kerr does not have an official area of concentration. Unlike traditional campuses, students are not separated into individual classes with one assigned teacher. Students can seek out a variety of peer and teacher input, and can work at their own pace, following their given deadlines. Rather than the teaching of a traditional classroom, students are taught in big centers, where students from 9-12 grade are together learning their different core subjects.

Students usually apply to Kerr in their 8th grade year, but applications can be accepted in later grades. Students and their parents must attend an orientation and then students submit applications. Admission to Kerr is determined based on grades, student behavior, and attendance records. Traditional high schools in Alief ISD are assigned by a lottery to either Alief Elsik High School, Alief Hastings High School, or Alief Taylor High School. Alief Kerr and Alief Taylor are located across the street from each other; Kerr shares transportation with Alief Taylor.

Kerr High School added an extension building in the summer of 2017, which was targeted towards the fine arts, such as band, orchestra, choir, visual arts, and theater arts.

Independent learning 
Kerr is based on independent learning. Under a teacher's guidance, the student proceeds through their course on their own. They are given deadlines for completion of assignments, projects, and tests.

Although students are in an independent learning environment, they can always ask teachers for help. Mondays through Fridays (excluding Wednesdays due to it being a short school day) are days where students can stay after school for tutorials or seminars for any extra help. An example of this would be on Mondays where the Science center is open during after-school hours for students to come for any needed help or to ask questions on material. Students may also go the library to complete assignments, study, or read.

In many classes, teachers go over the course material once a week in a seminar. Separate seminar rooms are available for teacher instruction. These seminars are usually given when students receive a new PAK, or a few days before testing day, as a review.

Personal Activity Kits 

Instead of traditional assignments, PAKs (Personal Activity Kits) are administered for each class. PAKs include all the work for the unit. Teachers inform students of the objectives, direct them to learning materials, and prepare them for tests/quizzes. The PAK system encourages students to participate in teamwork, seminars, and large groups to provide opportunities for teacher-directed and group learning. After the PAK is turned in, a test or a quiz is given over that material. New PAKs are typically issued every one to two weeks.

Centers

Instead of small traditional classrooms, Alief Kerr has large centers for each core subject. Every class in a specific subject is held in the subject's center. For example, all the science classes are held in the Science Center. This includes Anatomy, Astronomy, Biology, Chemistry, Environmental Science, Aquatic Science, and Physics. Centers can hold up to 150 students. Teachers are typically responsible for more than one subject at a time. A science teacher may be teaching Chemistry I, Physics I, and AP Physics during the same period. The centers at Alief Kerr include Art, Business, English, Foreign Language, Math, Science, and Social Studies.

Webmastering/Computer Science, Journalism, and Speech are all held in traditional-type classrooms. While these classrooms are smaller than the major centers, these classes still abide by Kerr's theme of independent learning and the PAK system.

Testing
Because of Kerr's unusual environment, traditional examination administration is difficult, especially when other classes are in the center. The three main testing administration methods at Kerr:

 Teachers pull their students away from the center (into a seminar room) and administer the test themselves.
 The whole center will have its tests due on the same date and turn into a testing zone. For example, all the science classes schedule their tests on the same date and close the center for testing.
 Students take their tests in the testing center.

The testing center is where tests are administered for most classes.

Clubs and organizations 
Some clubs organize events throughout the school year. Each has a sponsor who is a Kerr staff member, who help supervises the club and its officers. The clubs at Kerr encourage students to be more involved in school activities and form friendships throughout that experience. The clubs welcome anyone who wants to join. Some clubs at Kerr include:

 African Student Association
 Anime Club
 Art Club
 Board Game Club
 Cadre Kerr
 Chess Club
 Christian Fellowship
 Engineering Club
 Future Business Leaders of America (FBLA)
 Gamer Club
 HOME Club
 Kerr Film Society
 Kerr Fitness Club (KFC)
 Kerr Pals
 Korean Club
 Latinx Association
 Muslim Student Association
 National Art Honor Society
 National Honor Society
 No Tiger Left Behind
 Speech and Debate
 Student Council
 Students For Humanity
 Science National Honors Society

Fine Arts Program
When the school opened in 1994, it did not have a fine arts program, as instruction was limited to core academic areas. The school has since added fine arts instruction in band, orchestra, choir, art, theater, and speech and debate.

Rankings and acknowledgements

Kerr High School was awarded the Blue Ribbon School Award of Excellence by the United States Department of Education, the highest award an American school can receive, during the 2010–11 school year. The school also received the award in 2016, one of only 26 Texas schools to receive the award.

TEA acknowledgements
Alief Kerr achieved the "Recognized" status from the Texas Education Agency accountability ratings system in the 2006, 2007 and 2008 school years. For the 2009, 2010, and 2011 school years, Alief Kerr received the highest recognition possible, "Exemplary", from the TEA.

2008 Texas Education Agency Gold Performance Acknowledgements Program:

 Advanced Course/Dual Enrollment Completion
 Advanced Placement/International Baccalaureate Results
 Attendance Rate
 Commended Performance: Reading/English Language Arts (ELA)
 Commended Performance: Mathematics
 Commended Performance: Social Studies
 Comparable Improvement: Reading/ELA
 Recommended High School Program/Distinguished Achievement Program
 SAT/ACT Results
 Texas Success Initiative-Higher Education Readiness Component: ELA
 Texas Success Initiative-Higher Education Readiness Component: Mathematics

For the 2018–2019 school year, the school received an A grade from the Texas Education Agency, with an overall score of 99 out of 100. The school received an A grade in all three domains with a score of 98 in Student Achievement, 97 in School Progress, and 100 in Closing the Gaps. The school received six of the seven possible distinction designations. "Top 25%: Comparative Academic Growth" was the only distinction the school did not receive.

Children At Risk is a policy research and advocacy organization focused on improving children's quality of life. The organization ranks public high schools in eight counties of the Houston metro area. Kerr has done well on Children At Risk rankings annually. It is currently ranked 5th in the Greater Houston Area. Kerr is also ranked 4th best as a Math and Science school in the Houston area. In addition, Kerr was 10th "most improved" in the Houston area.

See also
 Alief Independent School District

References

External links

 

Educational institutions established in 1994
Alief Independent School District high schools
Public high schools in Houston
Magnet schools in Texas
1994 establishments in Texas